Living or The Living may refer to:

Common meanings
Life, a condition that distinguishes organisms from inorganic objects and dead organisms
 Living species, one that is not extinct
Personal life, the course of an individual human's life
 Human life (disambiguation)
 Human condition
 Living wage, refers to the minimum hourly wage necessary for a person to achieve some specific standard of living
 Living (Christianity) or benefice, in canon law, a position in a church that has attached to it a source of income

Music 
 Living (Paddy Casey album) or the title song, "Livin, 2003
 Living (Judy Collins album), 1971
Living 2001–2002, an album by the John Butler Trio, 2003
Living (EP) or the title song, by Josephine Collective, 2007
 "Living" (song), by Dierks Bentley, 2019
 The Living (band), early 1980's Seattle Punk Rock band featuring Duff McKagan

Television and film 
 Living (1954 TV program), a 1954–1955 Canadian informational program
 Living (2007 TV program), a 2007–2009 group of regional Canadian lifestyle programs
 Living (New Zealand TV channel), a New Zealand television station
 Living (UK TV channel), now Sky Witness, a British pay TV channel
 Living2, later Real Lives, a defunct sister channel
 Living (2012 film), a 2012 Russian drama film
 Living (2022 film), British remake of Akira Kurosawa's Ikiru
 The Living, a 2014 American drama film

Other 
 Living (Christianity), an ecclesiastical patronage arrangement once allowed by the Anglican Church
 Living (novel), a 1929 novel by Henry Green
 The Living (novel), a 1992 novel by Annie Dillard
Martha Stewart Living, a magazine and a defunct television program

See also 

 Biological material (disambiguation)
 Life (disambiguation)
 Lives (disambiguation)
 Livings, a surname
 Lyfing
 Organic (disambiguation)